Michael Rulli (born March 11, 1969) is an American politician serving as an Ohio State Senator from the 33rd District. In 2018, Rulli defeated Democrat John Boccieri, an incumbent member of the Ohio House of Representatives. Prior to that election contest, Rulli's only other political experience was as a Board of Education member for the Leetonia Exempted Village School District in Columbiana County. Rulli defeated Democrat Bob Hagan 66% to 34% in the 2022 election cycle.

References

External links
http://rulliforsenate.com/ home page
http://www.vindy.com/news/2018/nov/06/election-update-michael-rulli-wins-33rd-district-s/

Living people
Republican Party Ohio state senators
School board members in Ohio
21st-century American politicians
1969 births